

This is a list of the National Register of Historic Places listings in Armstrong County, Texas.

This is intended to be a complete list of properties and districts listed on the National Register of Historic Places in Armstrong County, Texas.  The locations of National Register properties and districts (at least for all showing latitude and longitude coordinates below) may be seen in a map by clicking on "Map of all coordinates".

There are 4 properties and districts listed on the National Register in the county, including 1 National Historic Landmark

Current listings

|}

See also

National Register of Historic Places listings in Texas
Recorded Texas Historic Landmarks in Armstrong County

References

Armstrong County, Texas
Armstrong County